Thoreau is a census-designated place (CDP) in McKinley County, New Mexico, United States. The population was 1,863 at the 2000 census. It is majority Native American, primarily of the Navajo Nation, as this community is located within its boundaries.

Practically all residents pronounce the town's name like "thuh-ROO" (similar to "through" or "threw") and not like "thorough" or "throw." A history of the town was compiled by local author Roxanne Trout Heath in her book Thoreau, Where the Trails Cross!, published in 1982.
The ZIP code for Thoreau is 87323.

Geography
Thoreau is located at  (35.414370, -108.223594).

Thoreau is located in a broad valley beneath a large escarpment of Entrada sandstone, which marks the southern boundary of the Colorado Plateau to the north. Mount Powell and Castle Rock are landmarks along this escarpment adjacent to Thoreau. The Zuñi Mountains are to the south.

Interstate40 and the historic U.S. Route 66 pass near and through the community, respectively. New Mexico State highways 122, 371, and 612 also pass through or terminate here. Additionally, two natural gas pipelines and a major railway pass through the community.

The climate in Thoreau is arid, with the sparse vegetation typical of the region. Common plants include pinyon pine and juniper trees, sagebrush, tumbleweeds, and some short, sparse grasses. The four seasons are well pronounced. Summers are relatively mild, due to Thoreau's high elevation and persistently low humidities. The Southwest monsoon brings thunderstorms with frequent lightning in July and August. Autumn is pleasant with warm days and cool nights. Cold, persistent, very high winds are common in Spring, usually through much of the month of March.

Demographics

As of the census of 2000, there were 1,863 people, 532 households, and 405 families residing in the CDP. The population density was 117.1 people per square mile (45.2/km2). There were 599 housing units at an average density of 37.6 per square mile (14.5/km2). The racial makeup of the CDP was 23.19% White, 0.11% African American, 71.12% Native American, 0.05% Asian, 0.05% Pacific Islander, 3.27% from other races, and 2.20% from two or more races. Hispanic or Latino of any race were 9.34% of the population.

There were 532 households, out of which 49.8% had children under the age of 18 living with them, 50.2% were married couples living together, 21.2% had a female householder with no husband present, and 23.7% were non-families. 19.7% of all households were made up of individuals, and 3.4% had someone living alone who was 65 years of age or older. The average household size was 3.50 and the average family size was 4.16.

In the CDP, the population was spread out, with 40.7% under the age of 18, 10.3% from 18 to 24, 26.6% from 25 to 44, 17.8% from 45 to 64, and 4.6% who were 65 years of age or older. The median age was 24 years. For every 100 females, there were 92.5 males. For every 100 females age 18 and over, there were 90.0 males.

The median income for a household in the CDP was $29,280, and the median income for a family was $29,708. Males had a median income of $29,000 versus $23,092 for females. The per capita income for the CDP was $10,516. About 23.3% of families and 30.2% of the population were below the poverty line, including 40.5% of those under age 18 and 26.9% of those age 65 or over.

Community

Education
It is in Gallup-McKinley County Public Schools.

Thoreau supports three public schools in that district. Thoreau Elementary School (grades Kindergarten through 5th), Thoreau Mid School (grades 6th through 8th), and Thoreau High School (grades 9th through 12th) serve the town as well as surrounding rural communities in eastern McKinley County. The public school mascot is the Hawks, and the school colors are green and gold.

The St. Bonaventure Indian School is in Thoreau. It started as a preschool in 1980, added an elementary school, and had high school from 1986 to 2001. It is also known as the Blessed Kateri Tekakwitha Academy, named after the first Native American Catholic saint in North America.

Religion
The majority-Native American population is primarily Navajo. Many practice the Navajo traditional beliefs ["medicine men and Native American Church (peyote way)]; in addition, some are also members of several Christian congregations, such as the Saint Bonaventure Catholic mission, The Church of Jesus Christ of Latter-day Saints, and several Protestant denominations including Baptists, Church of Christ, Church of God, and some independent evangelical congregations.

Navajo culture
Thoreau is located within the Navajo Nation, which is the largest Native American tribe in the United States. Its culture and history are strong in Thoreau. The Navajo Nation operates a Chapter House here, and many Navajo (or Diné) residents speak their native language. Thoreau is a local trading center for artisans, who create through rug weaving, sandpainting, silversmithing, potterymaking, and making turquoise jewelry. Anasazi archaeological sites connecting with Chaco Canyon can be found in and around the town.

See also
 List of census-designated places in New Mexico
 Casamero Pueblo, northeast of Thoreau

References

External links

Census-designated places in McKinley County, New Mexico
Census-designated places in New Mexico
Populated places on the Navajo Nation